Joe Flanagan may refer to:

 Joe Flanagan (soccer), American soccer coach
 Joe Flanagan (footballer) (1898–1985), Australian rules footballer
 Joe Flanagan, accordionist, see Flanagan Brothers

See also
 Joe Flanigan (born 1967), American television actor